The 1979 National Challenge Cup was the 66th edition of the USSF's annual open soccer championship. Teams from the North American Soccer League declined to participate.  Brooklyn Dodgers S.C. of Brooklyn, New York defeated the Chicago Croatia of Chicago, Illinois in the final game. The score was 2–1.

References

External links
 1979 U.S. Open Cup – TheCup.us

National Challenge Cup
U.S. Open Cup